United States v. Oregon may refer to:
United States v. State of Oregon (295 U.S. 1), a United States Supreme Court case from 1935 concerning a quiet title action
United States v. State of Oregon (II) (295 U.S. 701), a United States Supreme Court case from 1935 concerning a quiet title action
United States v. Oregon (1961) (366 U.S. 643), United States Supreme Court case from 1961 concerning the property of a veteran who died intestate
 A case that was combined with Sohappy v. Smith (302 F.Supp. 899), a 1969 United States federal district court case concerning fishing rights of Native Americans. (See United States v. Washington for further info.)
Gonzales v. Oregon, a 2006 United States Supreme Court case in which the United States Department of Justice unsuccessfully challenged the Oregon Death with Dignity Act